Reinga is a genus of South Pacific intertidal spiders first described by Raymond Robert Forster & C. L. Wilton in 1973.

Species
 it contains five species, all found in New Zealand:
Reinga apica Forster & Wilton, 1973 – New Zealand
Reinga aucklandensis (Marples, 1959) – New Zealand
Reinga grossa Forster & Wilton, 1973 – New Zealand
Reinga media Forster & Wilton, 1973 – New Zealand
Reinga waipoua Forster & Wilton, 1973 – New Zealand

References

Araneomorphae genera
Desidae
Spiders of New Zealand
Taxa named by Raymond Robert Forster